Hulk and the Agents of S.M.A.S.H. is an animated television series based on the superheroes Hulk, She-Hulk, Red Hulk, Skaar and A-Bomb. The series premiered on Disney XD in the United States on August 11, 2013 and officially ended on June 28, 2015. Hulk and the Agents of S.M.A.S.H. aired alongside Ultimate Spider-Man, Avengers Assemble and Guardians of the Galaxy during the Marvel Universe block on Disney XD.

Series overview

Episodes

Season 1 (2013–14)

Season 2 (2014–15)

References

Hulk and the Agents of SMASH
Hulk and the Agents of SMASH episodes
Hulk and the Agents of SMASH episodes